The 3rd CISM World Winter Games were held in Sochi, Russia from 23 to 27 February 2017.

Host selection and venues 

Sochi was chosen as the host city for the 3rd Winter Military Games at the 70th general assembly of the International Military Sports Council in Kuwait City, Kuwait in 2015. The Games were held in sports venues built for the 2014 Winter Olympic Games.

The sports complex is composed of two clusters: the Coastal Cluster, i.e. the Olympic Park, and the Mountain Cluster, i.e. the Krasnaya Polyana.

The following venues built for the Olympic Games were used for the Military Games:

Mascots and brand style
The official mascot for the 3rd Winter Games was the Leopard. According to the official website of the Games, it was chosen "due to the fact that the endurance of this animal and his fighting spirit characterize the spirit of war games. The leopard symbolizes the swiftness of the attack and the speed of decision-making, as well as power and strength [...] In the heraldic traditions, a leopard is a symbol of bravery and courage – the qualities traditionally characterizing soldiers." Other mascots include the Hare and the Little Fox.

The brand style for the Games is a blue-red star with a head of a leopard on it. The colour red symbolizes "sport passion and will to win" and blue "infinite opportunities and devotion to reach the goal". The colours of the star and the leopard forms the Russian flag. Also, ice patterns and mountains occur on the brand.

Schedule

Participating nations 
Overall, athletes from 25 countries participated.

Medal winners

Alpine skiing

Men

Women

Biathlon

Men

Women

Mixed

Cross-country skiing

Men

Women

Short track

Men

Women

Mixed
The teams in the mixed event were made up of sportsmen representing different countries, in accordance to the International Skating Union rules.

Ski mountaineering

Men

Women

Ski orienteering

Men

Women

Sport climbing

Men

Women

Medal table

References

External links

  Official website

Military World Games
February 2017 sports events in Russia
2017 in winter sports
Sports competitions in Sochi
21st century in Sochi
2017 in Russian sport
Military
Winter multi-sport events in Russia